The 2019 Sarasota Open was a professional tennis tournament played on clay courts. It was the 11th edition of the tournament which was part of the 2019 ATP Challenger Tour. It took place in Sarasota, Florida, United States between 15 and 21 April.

Singles main-draw entrants

Seeds

 1 Rankings are as of April 8, 2019.

Other entrants
The following players received wildcards into the singles main draw:
  Jenson Brooksby
  Nick Hardt
  Jared Hiltzik
  Sebastian Korda
  Noah Rubin

The following player received entry into the singles main draw using a protected ranking:
  Daniel Nguyen

The following player received entry into the singles main draw as an alternate:
  Aleksandar Vukic

The following players received entry into the singles main draw using their ITF World Tennis Ranking:
  Sekou Bangoura
  Sandro Ehrat
  Aslan Karatsev
  Arthur Rinderknech
  Alexander Zhurbin

The following players received entry from the qualifying draw:
  Harri Heliövaara
  Zane Khan

Champions

Singles

 Tommy Paul def.  Tennys Sandgren 6–3, 6–4.

Doubles

 Martín Cuevas /  Paolo Lorenzi def.  Luke Bambridge /  Jonny O'Mara 7–6(7–5), 7–6(8–6).

References

External links
Official Website

2019 ATP Challenger Tour
2019
2019 in American tennis
April 2019 sports events in the United States
2019 in sports in Florida